The Apertura 2018 Copa MX Final was the final of the Apertura 2018 Copa MX, the thirteenth edition of the Copa MX under its current format and 80th overall organized by the Mexican Football Federation, the governing body of association football in Mexico.

The final was contested in a single leg format between Liga MX clubs Monterrey and Cruz Azul. The match was hosted by Monterrey at Estadio BBVA Bancomer in the Monterrey suburb of Guadalupe on 31 October 2018. The winners earned a spot to face the winners of the Clausura 2019 in the 2019 Supercopa MX.

Qualified teams

Venue

Due to the tournament's regulations, the higher seed among both finalists during the group stage will host the final, thus Estadio BBVA Bancomer hosted the final. The venue which opened on 2 August 2015 is the newest venue in Liga MX and has been home to Monterrey since the Apertura 2015 season. The venue has previously hosted two Liga MX finals (Clausura 2016 and Apertura 2017) and one Copa MX final (Apertura 2017).

Background
Monterrey has won the tournament twice while Cruz Azul has won it three times. Before reaching this final, the last time Monterrey reached a reached a final of any kind was the previous December when they defeated Pachuca 1–0 to capture the Apertura 2017 Copa MX. Cruz Azul last reached a final back in 2014 where they defeated Toluca 1–1 (on away goals) in the 2013–14 CONCACAF Champions League final.

These two clubs last faced each other in a final back in 2009 when Monterrey won 6–4 on aggregate to capture the Apertura 2009 league title. The clubs also faced each other in the 1969 Copa México Final where Cruz Azul came out victorious.

Monterrey won three, drew once, lost none and scored nine goals during group stage, as they were seeded third. They eliminated Zacatepec in the Round of 16, Querétaro in the quarterfinals, and Pachuca in the semifinals.

Cruz Azul won two, drew one, lost one and scored seven goals during group stage, as they were seeded ninth. They defeated Tijuana in the Round of 16, Juárez in the quarterfinals, and León on penalty kicks in the semifinals.

Road to the finals
Note: In all results below, the score of the finalist is given first.

Match

Broadcasters

Notes

References

Copa MX Finals
2018–19 in Mexican football
2018 in Mexican sports
October 2018 sports events in Mexico